Wan Sukairi bin Wan Abdullah is a Malaysian politician and currently serves as Terengganu State Executive Councillor. He currently also served as the State Youth and Sports Exco.

Election Results

References

Malaysian Islamic Party politicians
Members of the Terengganu State Legislative Assembly
Terengganu state executive councillors
21st-century Malaysian politicians
Living people
Year of birth missing (living people)
People from Terengganu
Malaysian people of Malay descent
Malaysian Muslims